Rabia Bhuiyan is a Jatiya Party (Ershad) politician and a Member of Parliament from a reserved seat. She was the first female barrister and speaker of the parliament in Bangladesh.

Early life 
Bhuiyan was born on 1 March 1944 in Dhaka, East Bengal, British India. She married AKM Mozammel Hoque Bhuiyan.

Career 
Bhuiyan was elected to parliament from reserved seat as a Jatiya Party (Ershad) candidate in 1996. She and her husband founded Bhuiyan Academy which provides distance learning for law courses from University of London. She served as the Minister of Social Welfare and Women's Affairs in the First Sheikh Hasina Cabinet. She served as the speaker of the parliament for one day, the first female speaker of the parliament in Bangladesh. She filed a landmark environment case titled Rabia Bhuiyan, MP v Ministry of LGRD which acknowledged that the government has a responsibility to ensure access to safe drinking water.

References 

Jatiya Party (Ershad) politicians
Living people
Women members of the Jatiya Sangsad
7th Jatiya Sangsad members
1944 births
20th-century Bangladeshi women politicians
Jatiya Party politicians